Robert J. Delaney (born November 1, 1951) is a former undercover New Jersey state trooper and professional basketball referee in the National Basketball Association (NBA) who officiated from the 1987–88 NBA season up until the 2010–11 NBA season. Beginning the 2006–07 NBA season, Delaney had officiated in 1,182 regular season games, 120 playoff games, and seven NBA Finals games. In addition, he was assigned to the 1998 NBA All-Star Game. He wore the uniform number 26.

Delaney is a 1985 graduate of New Jersey City University with a Bachelor of Science degree in criminology. He is a 2006 inductee into NJCU's Athletics Hall of Fame. After finishing college, Delaney joined the New Jersey State Police. During the mid-1970s, Delaney worked as an undercover officer as part of an operation known as "Project Alpha".

While serving as a police officer, Delaney was also a high school basketball referee in New Jersey from 1972 to 1982 and later officiated in the Continental Basketball Association (CBA) for four years before being selected by scouts to officiate in the NBA, beginning in 1987.

In the early 1980s, Delaney retired as a law enforcement officer and devoted full-time to becoming a basketball referee. In 2008, he wrote about his undercover experience in Covert: My Years Infiltrating the Mob, with co-author Dave Scheiber. He completed a Master of Arts degree in leadership from Saint Mary's College of California.

In August 2018, Delaney was given the newly created position of Special Advisor for Officiating Development and Performance by the Southeastern Conference. He will serve as a consultant to the officiating coordinators in each of the college conference's sports, as well as assist the men's and women's coordinators of basketball officials with training, development, and evaluation.

On January 22, 2020, Delaney received the Theodore Roosevelt Award, the highest honor accorded by the NCAA.

References

External links 
Bob Delaney National Basketball Referees Association
Never Be Average – Bob Delaney  National Basketball Referees Association (July 7, 2006).

National Basketball Association referees
Living people
1951 births
American state police officers
Sportspeople from Paterson, New Jersey
New Jersey City University alumni
Continental Basketball Association referees